Paul Draper is an anthropologist, academic, and an award-winning  mentalist, magician, and film maker. As an anthropologist and communications expert specializing in the cognitive science of religious beliefs, he has lectured at Fortune 500 companies and universities. As the creator of the show Mental Mysteries, Draper blends his academic background as an anthropologist and communications expert with the arts of mentalism and magic.   Draper has been described as a pioneer in the field of live online magic shows, regularly performing live streaming shows during the COVID-19 pandemic with viewing audiences of thousands of people.

Early life 

Born in Utah in 1978, Draper first became interested in magic when family members discovered Showplace Magic and Novelty in Salt Lake City.

The first full-length magic show that he saw was at the 49th Street Galleria when he was 7 and then developed his own show and started performing for his grade school every year.

Draper began performing magic for his friends at age 8 and continued performing throughout his school years, lettering in debate, choir, and drama.

In his high school years, he also became a national debate champion in original oratory and a state drama champion in pantomime. At age 16, Draper watched Michael Skinner perform at the Golden Nugget in Las Vegas, which propelled his interest in magic, which eventually led to his discovery of mentalism.

Education 
Before embarking on a career in magic and mentalism in Las Vegas, Draper received his Bachelor’s degree in Anthropology at Weber State University and attended UNLV for a Master’s degree in Rhetoric.

In 1999, Draper spent time as an anthropologist with the Navajo people on the Navajo Native American Reservation, where he learned about the power of oral tradition.

Career 
Before embarking on a career in magic and mentalism in Las Vegas, Draper worked as a lecturer in Utah at Westminster College and Weber State University and later as an instructor at the University of Nevada, Las Vegas where he taught communication studies. Recently Draper has returned part time to teaching at Soka University of America as an adjunct professor and distinguished lecturer.

In 2004, Draper gave up his full time academic career to follow his "childhood passion" of magic and mentalism, according to an interview with Psychology Today. At that time, he began working as the house magician at the Venetian Hotel and Casino in Las Vegas.

For Draper, these two career paths — anthropology and magic — coincide in the study of cognitive science, or how and why people believe what they do. “Nothing I do uses psychic power," Draper said in an interview with Psychology Today. "All I use is influence and persuasion.”Draper's work as the house magician at the Venetian Hotel and Casinos in Las Vegas lasted for several years. Eventually, Draper evolved his performance to blend magic and the "science" behind mentalism: perception, attention, and observation play key roles. In Mental Mysteries, Draper attempts to make the audience the star of the show, teaching viewers to read body language and feel as if they understand the minds of others.

In 2014, the International Magician's Society awarded Draper the prestigious Merlin Award for Best Corporate Performer.

He has lectured on these topics at Yale University, Apple Cupertino Headquarters, the University of Utah, the University of Southern California, the Magic Castle in Hollywood and The Magic Circle in London.

Draper has appeared as himself in numerous television shows and documentaries, including Hell's Kitchen, Pawn Stars, House Hunters, Criss Angel Mindfreak, HBO-sponsored The Comedy Festival at Caesars Palace, Ghost Adventures, and Houdini: Unlocking the Mystery. He has appeared alongside David Copperfield, Lance Burton, and Teller on the History Channel as a consultant and expert. He appeared as a magician on Hair Battle Spectacular and as a scorpion handler in Guerilla Magic. In March 2018 Draper was the guest scholar for an episode of What'sHerName women's history podcast on "Queen of Magic" Adelaide Herrmann.

Draper has also performed as an emcee, working with dignitaries such as Dieter F. Uchtdorf, of the Presidency of The Church of Jesus Christ of Latter-Day Saints.

He regularly appears at Comic Con events and acts as moderator in celebrity panel interviews.

In addition to performing, Draper also works as a consultant and guest lecturer for businesses, using his anthropology studies to talk about change management and leadership issues in the private sector. He also uses his performance to build self-esteem and agency in children. He frequently consults for medical companies, coaching employees on various communication methods.

He has designed special effects for theater and acted as a religious advisor for theater companies, drawing on his Jewish faith background. Paul Draper was also featured in an article by Makezine on his historical knowledge of Houdini's Legacy and Magicians in the Maker community.

He was profiled in a six-page cover story in the August 2021 edition of The Magic Circular Magazine in London, England, the publication of The Magic Circle. He was previously profiled in a six-page cover story in the March 2017 edition of M-U-M Magazine, the publication of the Society of American Magicians.
He is a member of the senior faculty of the McBride Magic & Mystery School.
Draper sits on the board of directors for the Inclusion Center for Community and Justice.

During the 2020 COVID-19 pandemic Draper began offering live magic shows over streaming platforms.  He has been described as a pioneer in this field, also offering two educational lectures to assist other performers.  Draper's online presentations include corporate speaking as well as family entertainment and school shows, and he regularly has thousands of viewers participating in his online streamed performances. Before the pandemic he was regularly performing at Disneyland.

In February of 2022 it was announced that Draper had accepted a faculty position as an adjunct professor and distinguished lecturer at Soka University of America.

Awards 

 2021 Society of American Magicians Presidential Citation for being the World's Preeminent Virtual Magic Presenter
 2020 Adam Cheyer Adam Award for Virtual Performance
 2014 Merlin Award for Best Corporate Performer, International Magicians Society 
 2009 Houdini Award winner for Best Mentalist
 2003 Volunteer Award, National Conference of Community and Justice
 2002 PCAM First place award winner for mentalism
 2000 Irene Ryan Acting Scholarship
 1999 American College Theater Association, National Theatrical Management Award
 1997 Finalist in Original Oratory, National Forensic League competition

Film, television and radio/podcasts appearances 

 The Discovery Channel Josh Gates Tonight "Behind Closed Gates"
 The Hallmark Channel
 Travel, Ghost Adventures "Fear Factory" Season 9 Episode 5 
 FOX, Hell's Kitchen 13 Chefs Compete 
 The History Channel, "Houdini: Unlocking the Mystery"
 A&E, "Criss Angel's Mindfreak: Burning Man"
 Oxygen Network, "Hairbattle Spectacular 2: I'm a Beautician, Not a Magician"
 Steven Spielberg, "Poltergeist (25th Anniversary Edition)"
 HGTV, "House Hunters Las Vegas" episodes 1-5
 The History Channel, "Pawn Stars: Learning the Ropes" 
 The History Channel, "Pawn Stars: Crosby, Stills & Cash" 
 Comcast, "Hocus Pocus: Denny and Lees Magic Studio"
 Comcast, "In Utah: Mysteries of the Mind: Parts 1-3"
 WB, "15 minutes of fame"
 ABC, "Duel", June 27, 2008 (contestant on US game show)
 CBS, "Touched By an Angel: Show Me The Way Home"
 What'sHerName women's history podcast, "THE DISAPPEARING WOMAN: Adelaide Herrmann" 
 The Magic Word Podcast, "An Hour With Paul Draper" February 2013
 Penguin Magic Podcast with Erik Tait
 The Branding For Entertainers Podcast, 
 The Magician's Code Podcast with Hadlen, "Manifesting Mystery (feat. Paul Draper)" Episode #009

Publications 

 Penguin Magic Live Act Lecture 
 Penguin Magic Live Lecture
 Murphy's Magic At the Table Experience
 Draper, Paul, Mentalism: Theory, History and Performance
 Draper, Paul, Cold Reading with Playing Cards
 Draper, Paul, The Magicians Journey
 Draper, Paul, History of the American Spiritualist Movement 1880 -1920
 Draper, Paul, "The effect of a "Psychic Fair" on casino floor drop rate: State Line and Silversmith Casino Wendover, Nevada 2002"

Works 

 "Mentalist and Magician Paul Draper Teams Up With Vegas, Broadway, and Late-Night TV Stars", Live Event, 2021 [Ft. Myers, Fla.]
 "Tender", short, 2016 Salt Lake 48 Hour Film Project
 Mr. Clown, documentary
 "The Great American Novel", short, 2015 Salt Lake 48 Hour Film Project
 "Enthusiasm", short, 2015 Las Vegas 48 Hour Film Project
 "Inefficiency", short, 2013 Las Vegas 48 Hour Film Project
 "Legacy", short, 2012 Las Vegas 48 Hour Film Project
 Level Up, short, 2011 Salt Lake 48 Hour Film Project
 Inheritance, short, 2010 Las Vegas 48 Hour Film Project
 "Choices", short, 2010 Salt Lake 48 Hour Film Project
 The Pitch, short, 2009 Utah 48 Hour Film Project (winner of Audience Favorite and Best Writing, 2009 Salt Lake City 48 Hour Film Project)
 Nathan's Story : Teenage Sex and Fatherhood, 2001 documentary, KUED Channel 7 Utah (Rocky Mountain regional Emmy Award, Best Documentary in Cultural Affairs 2002)

References

External links
 Draper as a Personality

American magicians
Living people
1978 births
Mentalists
American anthropologists
Weber State University